Sensus plenior is a Latin phrase that means "fuller sense" or "fuller meaning". It is used in Biblical exegesis to describe the supposed deeper meaning intended by God but not by the human author. Walter C. Kaiser notes that the term was coined by F. Andre Fernandez in 1927 but was popularized by Raymond E. Brown.

Brown defines sensus plenior as

That implies that more meaning can be found within scripture than the original human authors intended and so the study of scripture that isolates a particular book and concerns itself only with the details of the author's time and situation can be incomplete.

John Goldingay suggests that the citation of Isaiah 7:14 in Matthew 1:23 is a "stock example" of sensus plenior.

Conservative Christians have used the term to mean the larger or whole teaching of scripture.

See also
 Peshat

References

Additional references
 Raymond E. Brown, "The History and Development of the Theory of a Sensus Plenior," CBQ 15 (1953) 141 - 162.
 The Jerome Biblical Commentary Vol. 1 1971, Geoffry Chapman Publishers, London, pp. 605–23.
 David H. Stern, Jewish New Testament Commentary 1992, Maryland, pp. 11–4.

External links
 
 

Biblical exegesis
Latin religious words and phrases